The Kawasaki Ki-61 Hien (飛燕, "flying swallow") is a Japanese World War II fighter aircraft. Used by the Imperial Japanese Army Air Service, it was designated the "Army Type 3 Fighter" (三式戦闘機). Allied intelligence initially believed Ki-61s were Messerschmitt Bf 109s and later an Italian Macchi C.202, which led to the Allied reporting name of "Tony", assigned by the United States War Department. The design originated as a variant of the Kawasaki Ki-60, which never entered production. The Ki-61 became the only mass-produced Japanese fighter of the war to use a liquid-cooled inline V engine. Over 3,000 Ki-61s were produced. Initial prototypes saw action over Yokohama during the Doolittle Raid on 18 April 1942, and continued to fly combat missions throughout the war.

Design and development
The Ki-61 was designed by Takeo Doi and his deputy Shin Owada in response to a late 1939 tender by the Koku Hombu for two fighters, each to be built around the Daimler-Benz DB 601Aa. Production aircraft would use a Kawasaki licensed DB 601, known as the Ha-40, which was to be manufactured at its Akashi plant. The Ki-60 was to be a heavily armed specialised interceptor, with a high wing loading;  the Ki-61 was to be a more lightly loaded and armed general-purpose fighter, intended to be used mainly in an offensive, air superiority role at low to medium altitudes.

Both single-seat, single-engine fighters used the same basic construction: all-metal alloys with semi-monocoque fuselages and three-spar wings, with alloy-framed, fabric-covered ailerons, elevators and rudders. Priority was given to the Ki-60, which first flew in April 1941, while design work on the Ki-61 did not begin until December 1940. Although the Ki-61 was broadly similar to the Ki-60, it featured several refinements exploiting lessons learned from the disappointing flight characteristics of the earlier design.

The all-metal, semi-monocoque fuselage was basically oval in cross-section, changing to a tapered, semi-triangular oval behind the cockpit canopy, with a maximum depth of 1.35 m (4 ft 5 in). An unusual feature of the Ki-61 was that the engine bearers were constructed as an integral part of the forward fuselage, with the cowling side panels being fixed. For servicing or replacement, only the top and bottom cowling panels could be removed. A tapered, rectangular supercharger air intake was located on the port-side cowling. Behind the engine bulkhead were the ammunition boxes feeding a pair of synchronized 12.7 mm (.50 in) Ho-103 machine guns which were set in a "staggered" configuration (the port weapon slightly further forward than that to starboard) in a bay just above and behind the engine. The breeches partly projected into the cockpit, above the instrument panel. The Ho-103 was a light weapon for its caliber (around 23 kg/51 lb) and fired a light shell, but this was compensated for by its rapid rate of fire. The ammunition capacity was limited, having only around 250 rounds for each weapon. A self-sealing fuel tank with a capacity of 165 L (44 US gal) was located behind the pilot's seat. The windshield was armored and there was a 13 mm (.51 in) armor plate behind the pilot. The radiator and oil cooler for the liquid-cooled engine were in a ventral location below the fuselage and wing trailing edge, covered by a rectangular section fairing with a large, adjustable exit flap.

The evenly-tapered wings had an aspect ratio of 7.2 with a gross area of 20 m2 (215.28 ft2) and featured three spars; a Warren truss main spar and two auxiliary spars. The rear spar carried the split flaps and long, narrow-chord ailerons, while the front spar incorporated the undercarriage pivot points. The undercarriage track was relatively wide at 4 m (13 ft 1.5 in). Each wing had a partially self-sealing 190 L (50 US gal) fuel tank behind the main spar, just outboard of the fuselage. A single weapon (initially a 7.7 mm/0.303 in Type 89 machine gun) was able to be carried in a weapons bay located behind the main spar.

The first prototype of the San-shiki-Sentohki ichi gata ("Type 3 Fighter, Model 1", the official IJAAF designation) first flew in December 1941 at Kagamigahara Airfield. Although test pilots were enthusiastic about its self-sealing fuel tanks, upgraded armament, and good dive performance, the wing loading of 146.3 kg/m2 (30 lb/ft2) at an all-up weight of 2,950 kg (6,500 lb) was viewed with scepticism by many of the senior officers of the Koku Hombu, who still believed in the light, highly manoeuvrable, lightly armed fighter epitomised by the then new Nakajima Ki-43-I-Hei which had a wing loading of 92.6 kg/m2 (19 lb/ft2) (and even that was considered borderline compared to the earlier Ki-27).

To address these concerns, Kawasaki staged a fly-off between two Ki-61 prototypes and the Nakajima Ki-43-I, a pre-production Nakajima Ki-44-I, a defector-flown Lavochkin-Gorbunov-Goudkov LaGG-3, a Messerschmitt Bf 109E-7, and a captured Curtiss P-40E Warhawk. The Ki-61 proved the fastest of all the aircraft and was inferior only to the Ki-43 in manoeuvrability.

The Ki-61 was the last of the fighters powered by the DB-601 or its foreign derivatives, and it was soon overshadowed by fighters with more powerful engines. By the time it first flew in December 1941, one year after the Macchi C.202's first flight and three years after the first Bf 109E, the engine was already underpowered compared to the new 1,120 kW (1,500 hp) inline or 1,491 kW (2,000 hp) radial engines being developed (and already nearing the mass-production stage) to power the next generation of combat aircraft such as the Republic P-47 Thunderbolt. Moreover, the inline Ha-40 engine proved to be an unreliable powerplant.

The DB-601 engine required precise and sophisticated manufacturing; the Ha-40 was lighter by roughly 30 kg (70 lb) and required even higher manufacturing standards. Reaching these standards proved difficult for Japanese manufacturers, an issue further complicated by the variable quality of materials, fuel, and the lubricants needed to run a sensitive, high-performance engine. The Japanese equivalent of the more powerful DB-605 engine was the Kawasaki Ha-140, which was fitted onto the Type 3 to produce the Ki-61-II high-altitude interceptor.

Compared to the Ki-61-I, the Ki-61-II had 10% greater wing area, used more armour and was powered by the Kawasaki Ha-140 engine generating 1,120 kW (1,500 hp). After overcoming initial fuselage and wing stability problems, the new interceptor reverted to the original wing and was put into service as the Ki-61-II-KAI. However, the Ha-140 engine had severe reliability problems that  were never fully resolved, and around half of the first batch of engines delivered were returned to the factory to be re-built. A US bombing raid on 19 January 1945 destroyed the engine factory in Akashi, Hyōgo, and 275 Ki-61-II-KAI airframes without engines were converted to use the Mitsubishi Ha-112-II radial engine, resulting in the Ki-100. While the Ha-112 solved the problems encountered with the Ha-140, the new engine still had a major weakness: a lack of power at altitude, which diminished its ability to intercept high-flying B-29 Superfortresses relative to the Ki-61-II.

During testing, the Hien proved capable, but several shortcomings were subsequently revealed in operational service, namely the armor protection that was insufficient against larger guns and a sub-standard engine that eventually led to a new engine being considered.

Operational history

The Ki-61 looked so different from  the usual radial-engined Japanese fighters that the Allies at first believed it to be of German or Italian origin, possibly a license-built Messerschmitt Bf 109. The first Ki-61 seen by Allied aircrew had been misidentified as a Bf 109 by USAAF Capt. C. Ross Greening during the Doolittle Raid. In early reports, when it was thought to have been a German fighter, the Ki-61 had been code-named "Mike". The final, and better known code name adopted was "Tony", because the Ki-61 looked like an Italian aircraft.

The new Ki-61 Hien fighters entered service with a special training unit, the 23rd Chutai, and entered combat for the first time in early 1943, during the New Guinea campaign. The first Sentai (Air Group/Wing) fully equipped with the Hien was the 68th in Wewak, New Guinea, followed by the 78th Sentai stationed at Rabaul. Both units were sent into a difficult theatre where jungles and adverse weather conditions, coupled with a lack of spares, quickly undermined the efficiency of both men and machines. Because the Ki-61 was so new, and had been rushed into service, it inevitably suffered from teething problems. Almost all of the modern Japanese aircraft engines, especially the Ki-61's liquid-cooled engines, suffered a disastrous series of failures and ongoing problems, which resulted in the obsolescent Ki-43 still forming the bulk of the JAAF's fighter capability.

Initially, this campaign went successfully for the Japanese Army Air Force (JAAF), but when the Allies re-organized and enhanced the combat capabilities of their air forces, they gained the upper hand against the JAAF. High non-combat losses were also experienced by the Japanese during this campaign. For example, while in transit between Truk and Rabaul, the 78th lost 18 of its 30 Ki-61s.

Even with these problems, there was some concern in Allied aviation circles regarding the Hien. The new Japanese fighter caused some pain and consternation among Allied pilots, particularly when they found out the hard way that they could no longer go into a dive and escape as they had from lighter Japanese fighters. General George Kenney, the Allied air forces commander in the Southwest Pacific, found his Curtiss P-40s completely outclassed, and begged for more Lockheed P-38 Lightnings to counter the threat of the new enemy fighter.

However, the increasing numerical strength of Allied bomber units, along with inadequate anti-aircraft systems, imposed crippling losses on Japanese units. Approximately 174 out of 200 Japanese aircraft based in the Wewak area were lost during the attacks of August 17–21 1943. By the end of the campaign, nearly 2,000 Japanese aircraft had been lost in air attacks from up to 200 Allied aircraft at a time, around half of which were Consolidated B-24 Liberators and North American B-25 Mitchells armed with fragmentation bombs. After the Japanese retreat, over 340 aircraft wrecks were later found at Hollandia.

The Ki-61 was also utilised in Southeast Asia, Okinawa, China and as an interceptor during US bombing raids over the Japanese home islands, including against Boeing B-29 Superfortresses. The Ki-61 was notable for many reasons: initially identified as of either German or Italian origin, these aircraft were capable of matching Allied aircraft such as the P-40 in speed, and as evaluation had already shown, were superior in almost every respect. However, the armament of the early Hien was lighter, but still sufficient for most purposes. Some authors claim that the Lockheed P-38 Lightning was measurably superior. The Ki-61 carried a great deal of fuel, but due to having self-sealing fuel tanks it was not considered readily flammable, as many other Japanese aircraft were.

Owing to the additional weight, the Ki-61's performance and agility suffered when its armament was increased, but it still remained capable with a 580 km/h (313 kn) maximum speed. The cannon armament was needed to counter the Allied bombers, which proved to be difficult to shoot down with only 12.7 mm (.50 in) machine guns. The empty and maximum weights for the Ki-61 prototype (2 × 12.7 mm/0.50 in + 2 × 7.7 mm/0.303 in) were 2,238 kg (4,934 lb) and 2,950 kg (6,504 lb), respectively; for the Ki-61-I basic (4 × 12.7 mm/.50 in) 3,130 kg (6,900 lb); and for the Ki-61-KAI (2 × 12.7 mm/0.50 in + 2 × 20 mm), 2,630 kg (5,798 lb) and 3,470 kg (6,750 lb).

A number of Ki-61s were also used in Tokkotai (kamikaze) missions launched toward the end of the war. The Ki-61 was delivered to 15th Sentai (group/wing), as well as some individual Chutaicho (Squadron Leaders) in other Sentai, and even to operational training units in the JAAF. The aircraft was largely trouble-free in service except for the liquid-cooled engine which tended to overheat when idling on the ground and suffered from oil circulation and bearing problems.

Ki-61 Special Attack Unit

The tactic of using aircraft to ram American Boeing B-29 Superfortresses was first recorded in late August 1944, when B-29s from Chinese airfields attempted to bomb the steel factories at Yawata. Sergeant Shigeo Nobe of the 4th Sentai intentionally flew his Kawasaki Ki-45 into a B-29; debris from the explosion severely damaged another B-29, which also went down. Other attacks of this nature followed, as a result of which individual pilots determined it was a practicable way of destroying B-29s.

On 7 November 1944, the officer commanding the 10th Hiko Shidan (Air division) made ramming attacks a matter of policy by forming ramming attack flights specifically to oppose the B-29s at high altitude. The aircraft were stripped of their fuselage armament and protective systems in order to attain the required altitudes. Although the term "kamikaze" is often used to refer to the pilots undertaking these attacks, the word was not used by the Japanese military.

The units assigned to the 10th Hiko Shidan included the 244th Hiko Sentai (Fighter group), then commanded by Captain Takashi Fujita, who organised a ramming flight called "Hagakure-Tai" ("Special Attack Unit"), which was composed out of volunteers from the three Chutai (squadrons) of the 244th: the 1st Chutai "Soyokaze", 2nd Chutai "Toppu", and the 3rd Chutai known as "Mikazuki".

First Lieutenant Toru Shinomiya was selected to lead the Hagakure-Tai. On 3 December 1944, Shinomiya – along with Sergeant Masao Itagaki and Sergeant Matsumi Nakano – intercepted a B-29 raid; Shinomaya rammed one B-29, but was able to land his damaged Ki-61, which had lost most of the port outer wing, back at base. After attacking another B-29 Itagaki had to parachute from his damaged fighter, while Nakano rammed and damaged Long Distance of the 498th BG and crash-landed his stripped-down Ki-61 in a field. Shinomaya's damaged Ki-61 was later displayed inside Tokyo's Matsuya department store while Nakano's Ki-61 was displayed outside, alongside of a life-size cut-away drawing of the forward fuselage of a B-29. These three pilots were the first recipients of the Bukosho, Japan's equivalent to the Victoria Cross or Medal of Honor, which had been inaugurated on 7 December 1944 as an Imperial Edict by Emperor Hirohito (there are 89 known recipients, most of whom fought and scored against B-29s). The existence of the ramming unit had been kept confidential until then, but it was officially disclosed in the combat results announcement and officially named "Shinten Seiku Tai" ("Body Attack Detachment") by the Defense GHQ. On 27 January 1945, Itakagi survived another ramming attack on a B-29, again parachuting to safety, and received a second Bukosho; he survived the war as only one of two known double-Bukosho recipients. Sergeant Shigeru Kuroishikawa was another distinguished member of the unit.

Despite their successful attacks, these pilots gained no reprieve, and were obliged to continue these deadly and dangerous ramming tactics until they were killed, or else wounded so badly that they could no longer fly. They were regarded as doomed men and were celebrated among the ranks of those who were going to certain death as Tokkotai (kamikaze) pilots.

Some other Ki-61 pilots also achieved renown, among them Major Teruhiko Kobayashi of the 244th Sentai, who was credited by some with a dozen victories mostly due to conventional attacks against B-29s.

Variants
Note: Ko, Otsu, Hei and Tei are the Japanese equivalents to a, b, c, d. Kai ('modified' or 'improved') was also used for some models of the Ki-61.
Ki-61-Hien
 Ki-61 Prototypes: 12 built
 Ki-61-I-Ko First production version: fully retractable tailwheel, two 7.7 mm (0.303 in) Type 89 machine guns in the wings and two synchronized 12.7 mm (0.50 in) Ho-103 machine guns in the forward decking. Capable of carrying one 151 L (40 gal) drop tank or a light bomb.
 Ki-61-I-Otsu Second production fighter variant: Tailwheel retraction mechanism was unreliable, the aircraft was modified accordingly. Two 12.7 mm (.50 in) Ho-103 machine guns replaced the wing 7.7 mm (.303 in) machine guns.
 Ki-61-I-Hei: The Hei was built in conjunction with the Otsu variant, the wing machine guns were replaced by Mauser MG 151/20 cannons.
 Ki-61-I-Tei Fighter variant with two fuselage mounted Japanese 20 mm Ho-5 cannon and two  12.7 mm (.50 in) wing mounted Ho-103 machine guns.
 Ki-61-I-KAId: Interceptor variant with 2 × 12.7 mm (.50 in) machine guns and 2 × 30 mm (1.18 in) Ho-155 wing cannon.
 Ki-61-I- w.c.e.s: Experimental aircraft with evaporation system, as used on the Heinkel He 100. It was the fastest Ki-61 built, achieving 630 km/h (395 mph).
 Ki-61-II Prototype with 1,120 kW (1,500 hp) Ha-140 engine and first flown in December 1943.
 Ki-61-II-KAI: Pre-production version which reverted to the Ki-61-I-Tei wing, a 220 mm (8.7 in) fuselage stretch, enlarged rudder, and Ha-140 engine; 30 built.
 Ki-61-II-KAIa: Armed with 2 x 12.7 mm (.50 in) machine guns in the wings and 2 x 20 mm cannon in the fuselage.
 Ki-61-II-KAIb: Armed with 4 x 20 mm cannon.
 Ki-61-III Prototype: This version had a cut-down rear fuselage and a canopy design which was later used by the Ki-100-I-Otsu

Production

Not included:

 Pre-production started with the first prototype completed in July 1941, and with further eleven builds in early 1942.

Note:

 Out of 374 Ki-61-II builds, 275 were completed as Ki-100 Ia.

Not included:

 Pre-production started with eight prototypes completed during Aug. 1943 to Jan. 1944.

Operators

 Imperial Japanese Army Air Service
Post War

Chinese Nationalist Air Force - Operated some captured aircraft

People's Liberation Army Air Force - also operated some captured aircraft

In 1945, Indonesian Air Force –then Indonesian People's Security Force (IPSF) (Indonesian pro-independence guerrillas)– captured a small number of aircraft at numerous Japanese air bases, including Bugis Air Base in Malang (repatriated 18 September 1945). Most aircraft were destroyed in military conflicts between the Netherlands and the newly proclaimed-Republic of Indonesia during the Indonesian National Revolution of 1945–1949.

Ki-61 units

The Hiko Sentai, usually referred to as Sentai, was the basic operational unit of the Imperial Japanese Army Air Force, composed of three or more Chutai (companies or squadrons). A Sentai had 27 to 49 aircraft, with each Chutai having 16 aircraft and pilots plus a maintenance and repair unit. Several sentai had other units under their operational control, most notably the Hagakure-Tai ("Special Attack Units") of the 244th Sentai. By 1944, with the depredations of Allied attacks on supply lines and airfields, as well as the loss of pilots and aircraft through combat attrition and accidents, few sentai were able to operate at full strength.

Surviving aircraft
 299 – Ki-61-Ia under restoration to static display at Ardmore, Auckland, New Zealand by AvSpecs. To be displayed at Papua New Guinea National Museum and Art Gallery once completed.
 379 – Ki-61-I in storage at the Fantasy of Flight in Polk City, Florida.
 640 – Ki-61-I under restoration to airworthy condition at Ardmore, Auckland, New Zealand by AvSpecs. It will become part of the Military Aviation Museum collection in Virginia Beach, Virginia.
 6117 – Ki-61-II-Kai on static display at the Kakamigahara Air and Space Museum in Kakamigahara, Gifu. Previously on display at the Chiran Peace Museum for Kamikaze Pilots in Chiran, Kagoshima; it was removed from the museum in September 2015 and restored by Kawasaki Heavy Industries from 2015 to 2016.

Specifications (Ki-61-I-KAIc)

See also

References

Notes

Citations

Bibliography
 Bílý, Miroslav . Kawasaki Ki-61 a Ki.100 (Profily letadel II. Svetové války no.4) (in Czech with English and German captions). Praha, Czech Republic: Modelpres, 1992. .
 
 Crosby, Francis. Fighter Aircraft. London: Lorenz Books, 2002. .
 Ethell, Jeffrey L. Aircraft of World War II. Glasgow: Collins/Jane's, 1995. .
  (new edition 1987 by Putnam Aeronautical Books, .)
 
 Gallagher, James P. Meatballs and Dead Birds: A Photo Gallery Of Destroyed Japanese Aircraft In World War II. Mexhanicsburg, Pennsylvania: Stackpole Books, 2004. .
 Gibertini, Giorgio. "Rondini Giapponesi" (in Italian).Aerei Nella Storia N.8, August 1998. Parma, Italy: West-ward edizioni.
 Green, William. "An Oriental Swallow." Air International, Vol. 9, no. 2, August 1975.
 
 * Gunston, Bill. World Encyclopedia of Aircraft Manufacturers: From the Pioneers to the Present Day. Annapolis, Maryland: Naval Institute Press, 1993. .
 Hata, Ikuhiko, Yasuho Izawa and Christopher Shores. Japanese Army Air Force Fighter Units and Their Aces, 1931-1945. London: Grub Street Publishing, 2002. .

 Janowicz, Krzysztof. 68 Sentai (in Polish). Lublin, Poland: Kagero, 2003. .
 Januszewski, Tadeusz and Adam Jarski. Kawasaki Ki-61 Hien, Monografie Lotnicze 5 (in Polish). Gdańsk, Poland: AJ-Press, 1992. ISSN 0867-7867.
 Mondey, David. The Hamlyn Concise Guide to Axis Aircraft of World War II. London: Bounty Books, 2006. .
 Sakaida, Henry. Japanese Army Air Force Aces 1937-45. Botley, Oxford, UK: Osprey Publishing, 1997. .
 Sakurai, Takashi. Hien Fighter Group: A Pictorial History of the 244th Sentai, Tokyo's Defenders (in Japanese/English). Tokyo: Dai Nippon Kaga, 2004. ISBN unknown.
 Sakurai, Takashi. Rikugun Hiko Dai 244 Sentai Shi (History of the Army 244 Group) (in Japanese). Tokyo: Soubunsha, 1995. ISBN unknown.
 Snedden, Robert. World War II Combat Aircraft. Bristol, UK: Parragon Book, 1997. .
 Takaki, Koji and Henry Sakaida. B-29 Hunters of the JAAF. Botley, Oxford, UK: Osprey Publishing, 2001. 
 Tanimura, Masami et al. Kawasaki Ki-61 (Tony). Blaine, Washington: Paul Gaudette, Publisher, 1967.
 United States Strategic Bombing Survey Aircraft Division. Kawasaki Aircraft Company, Ltd. Corporation Report IV, Washington, D.C. 1947.
 Vaccari, Pier Francesco. "Guerra Aerea in Nuova Guinea" (in Italian). Rivista Italiana Difesa, N.8, 2000.

External links

KI-61 article on vectorsite (public domain)
USN report on captured Ki-61 (pdf file)
Japanese website dedicated to the Tokkotai JAAF and JNAF
virtual page about performance of Ki-61Kai
Profile drawings and artwork on the Ki-61
The Many Faces of Tony "5017" - Article on Ki-61-II-Kai production No. 5017, still in existence
Ki-61-II Tony Manufacture Number 640 - Covers the discovery, recovery and restoration in some detail

Ki-061, Kawasaki
Ki-061
Ki-061, Kawasaki
Single-engined tractor aircraft
Aircraft first flown in 1941